Georges River College, Penshurst Girls Campus (formerly known as Penshurst Girls High School) is a comprehensive school for girls located in the suburb of Penshurst in Sydney, Australia.

Curriculum
In 2002, Penshurst Girls High School became part of the Georges River College and was renamed Penshurst Girls Campus. Students complete their studies in Years 7 to 10. Students move to Oatley Senior Campus to finish their senior studies.
The Georges River College was not in the top 150 high schools for HSC results in 2021.   High interested in selling overpriced uniform items.

Facilities and buildings
The school consists of four main blocks:
A Block consists of the Design & Technology classrooms - Kitchens, Textile rooms, Woodwork room, and computer labs. It also contains several multi-purpose classrooms used for a wide range of subjects.
B Block generally consists of Maths and English classrooms, but also contains several History and Geography classrooms.
C Block consists of all the CAPA (Creative & Performing Arts) classrooms, designed for Music, Visual arts, as well as Digital Photography -  a subject offered as an elective in years 9 and 10.
L Block consists of one multi-purpose classroom, computer labs, the library, as well as science labs.
The school has a Hall, an Agriculture Plot, a Performing Arts Space and a Flexible Learning Space.

Notable alumni
 Betty Kitchener AM, founder of mental health first aid training and CEO of Mental Health First Aid International.
 Deborah Cheetham AO, Aboriginal Australian soprano, actor, composer and playwright.

References

Public high schools in Sydney
Girls' schools in New South Wales
Educational institutions established in 1955
1955 establishments in Australia
School buildings completed in 1955
Penshurst, New South Wales
Alliance of Girls' Schools Australasia